Lukáš Bolf (born February 20, 1985) is a Czech professional ice hockey player who currently plays for Yertis Pavlodar of the Kazakhstan Hockey Championship. He was selected by the Pittsburgh Penguins in the 6th round (169th overall) of the 2003 NHL Entry Draft.

Bolf played with HC Sparta Praha in the Czech Extraliga during the 2010–11 Czech Extraliga season.

Career statistics

Regular season and playoffs

International

References

External links 
 
 

1985 births
Living people
Czech ice hockey defencemen
Pittsburgh Penguins draft picks
Arlan Kokshetau players
Barrie Colts players
HC Berounští Medvědi players
HC Oceláři Třinec players
HC Slovan Ústečtí Lvi players
HC Sparta Praha players
HK Dukla Trenčín players
KLH Vajgar Jindřichův Hradec players
Motor České Budějovice players
VHK Vsetín players
Yertis Pavlodar players
People from Vrchlabí
Sportspeople from the Hradec Králové Region
Czech expatriate ice hockey players in Slovakia
Czech expatriate ice hockey players in Canada
Czech expatriate ice hockey players in Finland
Czech expatriate sportspeople in Kazakhstan
Expatriate ice hockey players in Kazakhstan